The Fullerwood Park Residential Historic District is a U.S. historic district in St. Augustine, Florida. The district is roughly bounded on the north by Hildreth Drive, the south by Macaris Street, the west by San Marco Avenue and east by Hospital Creek.

It was added to the National Register of Historic Places on September 24, 2010.

References

National Register of Historic Places in St. Johns County, Florida
Historic districts on the National Register of Historic Places in Florida
St. Augustine, Florida